The plain-winged antwren (Myrmotherula behni) is a species of bird in the family Thamnophilidae. It is found in Brazil, Colombia, Ecuador, French Guiana, Guyana, and Venezuela.

Its natural habitat is subtropical or tropical moist montane forests.

References

Myrmotherula
Birds described in 1890
Birds of Colombia
Birds of Ecuador
Birds of the Guianas
Birds of Venezuela
Taxonomy articles created by Polbot